Sarakiniko is a beach on Milos Island, Greece, situated on the north shore of the island. Waves driven by north winds shape the greyish-white volcanic rock into amazing shapes, and the area is often compared to a moonscape. The local people often refer to the scenic landscape of Sarakiniko as Lunar. The bone-white beach derives its unusual characteristics from the erosion of the volcanic rock by wind and wave. Sarakiniko is one of the most photographed landscapes in the Aegean.

Gallery

See also
 Antimilos
 Kimolos
 Santorini

References

Beaches of Greece
Milos
Tourist attractions in the South Aegean
Landforms of Milos (regional unit)
Landforms of the South Aegean